"Ecuador" is a song produced by German DJ and record production team Sash! featuring fellow German DJ Rodriguez. It was released in April 1997 as the third single from their debut album, It's My Life – The Album (1997). The song became an international hit, peaking at number one in Flanders, Romania, Bulgaria and Scotland, as well as on the American and Canadian dance charts. It reached the top 20 in more than ten other countries worldwide.

Critical reception
Scottish Daily Record complimented "Ecuador" as a "intelligent dance hit" and a "catchy number". Daisy & Havoc from Music Weeks RM rated it three out of five, adding that it's "more listenable in our opinion than the mega success 'Encore'".

Chart performance
In the United Kingdom, "Ecuador" was almost as successful as "Encore une fois", reaching number two on the UK Singles Chart and earning Sash! a platinum certification for sales and streams in excess of 600,000 units. "Ecuador" reached number one in the Flanders region of Belgium, Romania and Scotland and the top 10 in Denmark, Finland, Germany, Ireland, the Netherlands, Norway, Sweden and Switzerland. It also reached the top 20 in Austria, France and Iceland. On the Eurochart Hot 100, "Ecuador" peaked at number three. In the United States, the song was the second number-one on the Billboard Hot Dance Club Play chart for Sash!. It was a more successful dance hit in Canada, becoming Sash!'s first number one on the RPM Dance Chart, staying at the top position for four weeks and ending the year as Canada's second-most successful dance single, behind Stars on 54's version of "If You Could Read My Mind".

Music video
The accompanying music video for "Ecuador" was directed by Oliver Sommer, who had previously directed the videos for "Encore une fois" and "Stay", and was shot in Lanzarote and Tenerife, Spain. It features female models appearing like bird-like creatures in a desert landscape. "Ecuador" was later published on YouTube in October 2016, and by June 2022, the video had generated more than 93 million views.

Track listings

 UK CD1 "Ecuador" (original radio edit) – 3:31
 "Ecuador" (Eat Me Edit – Bruce Wayne Mix) – 3:57
 "Ecuador" (K-Klass Klub Mix) – 8:14
 "Ecuador" (Bruce Wayne Mix) – 5:48
 "Ecuador" (Future Breeze Mix) – 5:24
 "Ecuador" (original 12-inch mix) – 5:23
 "Ecuador" (Poweblast Dub) – 7:30

 UK CD2'
 "Ecuador" (original radio edit) – 3:31
 "Ecuador" (Klubbheads Mix) – 6:31
 "Encore une fois" (ACD Mix) – 6:13
 "Ecuador" (PowerPlant "Inject This" Mix) – 7:21

Charts

Weekly charts

Year-end charts

Certifications

References

1997 singles
1997 songs
Multiply Records singles
Music videos directed by Oliver Sommer
Number-one singles in Romania
Number-one singles in Scotland
Sash! songs
Ultratop 50 Singles (Flanders) number-one singles